The Skilton Road Bridge is a historic stone arch bridge, carrying Skilton Road across the Nonewaug River in northwestern Watertown, Connecticut.  The bridge was built in 1865–66, and is a rare well-preserved example of a mid-19th century stone bridge.  It was listed on the National Register of Historic Places in 1991.

Description and history
The Skilton Road Bridge is located in a rural-residential area of northwestern Watertown, spanning the Nonewaug River between Hinman Road and Hickory Lane. It is made of dry laid local stone, and is built on a stone ledge on one side and a stone abutment on the other. The stones which form the barrel of the arch are roughly worked, while those filling the spandrels show little evidence of work. The arch is a slightly asymmetrical segmented arch, probably due to the difficulties involved in working at the site.

The bridge was built either in 1865–66, after the town voted in 1865 to fund its construction; Skilton Road was at the time the major route between Watertown and Bethlehem.  Stone, a more expensive construction material than wood, was probably chosen because of its longer lifespan, and because a mill dam just upstream (now breached) whose breach would have caused flooding that would endanger a wooden bridge.  This bridge is fairly typical of mid-19th century stone bridges, which were once quite numerous in the state.

See also
National Register of Historic Places listings in Litchfield County, Connecticut
List of bridges on the National Register of Historic Places in Connecticut

References

Bridges on the National Register of Historic Places in Connecticut
National Register of Historic Places in Litchfield County, Connecticut
Bridges completed in 1865
Buildings and structures in Litchfield County, Connecticut
Watertown, Connecticut
Stone arch bridges in the United States
Road bridges in Connecticut
1865 establishments in Connecticut